Robert Waymon Curtis (born October 23, 1964) is a former American football linebacker in the National Football League (NFL) for the Washington Redskins. He played college football at Savannah State University.

References

1964 births
Living people
American football linebackers
Savannah State Tigers football players
The Citadel Bulldogs football players
Washington Redskins players
Sportspeople from Macon, Georgia